Frank Albert Harris (19 March 1907 – 21 February 1936) was an English cricketer.  Harris was a right-handed batsman, but his bowling style is unknown. He was born in Bristol.

Harris made his first-class debut for Gloucestershire against Warwickshire in the 1929 County Championship.  He made 9 further first-class appearances, the last of which came against Lancashire in the 1931 County Championship.  In his 10 first-class matches he batted without success, scoring 68 runs at an average of 5.66, with a high score of 33.

He died in Bristol on 21 February 1936.

References

External links
Frank Harris at ESPNcricinfo
Frank Harris at CricketArchive

1907 births
1936 deaths
Cricketers from Bristol
English cricketers
Gloucestershire cricketers